Begum Jaan is a 2017 Indian Hindi period drama film. It is written and directed by National Film Award-winning director Srijit Mukherji and produced by Mukesh Bhatt, Vishesh Bhatt and Play Entertainment. The film is co-produced by Sakshi Bhatt and Shree Venkatesh Films with executive producer Kumkum Saigal. The cinematography is done by Gopi Bhagat. Lyrics, additional screenplay and dialogues have been penned by Kausar Munir and Rahat Indori.

The film was released on 14 April 2017. Vidya Balan plays the lead role of a brothel's madam, set in the backdrop of late Indian Independence period of 1948. It is a Hindi remake of the critically acclaimed Bengali film Rajkahini (2015). The film managed to recover its costs and was declared "Average".

Plot 
Movie opens with a small family and a young couple travelling in public transport in the late night, while the family getting down at their stop, a group of drunk goons gets into the bus and harasses the couple and tries to rape her where an old woman, saves the girl, undressing herself. Now the movie goes back to 1947.
In August 1947, after India sought independence from the British, the Last Viceroy of India, Mountbatten gave Cyril Radcliffe, the responsibility of dividing India into two parts – India and Pakistan. Radcliffe drew two lines – one in Punjab and another one in Bengal. This line was known as the Radcliffe Line.

Begum Jaan is a prostitute who runs a brothel between the cities of Shakargarh and Dorangla. The prostitutes in Begum Jaan's brothel are a number of girls she raised herself, who were either abandoned or disowned by their families and now work for her. The members of the brothel include an elderly woman known as Amma, Sujeet, a local worker who brings her customers and Salim, a gunman who guards them and also two dogs. They are pestered by government officers Hari Prasad, Ilyas Khan and Inspector Shyam Singh who visit her and ask all of the residents to evict the brothel, as it lies on the land that the Radcliffe Line is to pass through. Love is shown to blossom between Sujeet and Rubina. Begum Jaan's brothel is looked after by Raja Sahib, under whose protection, they are safe and sound. He pays their taxes and duties. Begum Jaan sends message to him for his help in this matter. He arrives at the brothel with gifts and presents for them and after hearing about their plight, he assures them of help by stating that he would be going to Delhi soon and discuss the matter there. However, he demands to spend the night with young Shabnam, who had recently joined the brothel as a mental wreck after abuse. Begum Jaan reluctantly forces Shabnam to sleep with Raja Sahib while she sings in the sidelines as he enjoys his night.

After several failed attempts to convince Begum Jaan and her team to leave despite giving them a month's notice, as a last resort, Hari and Ilyas, enlist the help of Kabir, an infamous killer in Sonapur, to threaten Begum with her members to vacate the brothel. Raja Sahib returns to the brothel one day to inform Begum Jaan that his efforts to save her brothel have failed and now she must vacate the brothel. Begum, who was having hopes from Raja Sahib is shocked in dismay. Still, she stubbornly tells Raja Sahib come what may, she'll rather die in her house like a queen than die on the streets like a beggar. Kabir proceeds to kill Begum's beloved dogs, even feeding their meat to Begum and her girls. He then kills Sujeet while he is returning from the market with a few other girls of the brothel. He persuades the girls to escape while sacrificing his life. This killing enrages Begum Jaan and her members further. As a result of Kabir's intimidation tactics, Begum asks Salim to train every one of her girls to use weapons and fight back. Intensive training practice sessions are held.

Meanwhile, Masterji, Laadli's teacher, is in love with Begum Jaan and proposes to her, unaware that another prostitute named Gulabo, harbors feelings for him as well. Begum Jaan rejects his proposal and asks him to leave, leading an irate Master to concoct a plan to kill her. He convinces Gulabo to run away from the brothel, betraying Begum Jaan. Gulabo does so but Masterji spurns her and gets her raped by his accomplices inside a horse carriage. She vows vengeance.

That same night, Kabir and his men attack the brothel. Laadli her mother and shabnam are forced to run away and are attacked by the policeman Shyam Singh, who seeks benefit from them, but laadli undresses herself which reminds him his ten years old daughter and he cries and asks her to stop. Begum and the girls fight back but to no avail. Gulabo returns and later slits Masterji's throat, while he is witnessing the attack on the brothel by Kabir and his goons. However, she has been badly assaulted by Masterji's accomplices and dies. The goons throw lighted torches inside the brothel, causing the building to be engulfed in flames. Begum Jaan and her girls put up a determined fight. Many are killed. She and her four surviving members smile while looking at their home being set ablaze; they walk inside the building and shut the doors. They burn to death as Amma narrates the story of Rani Padmavati of Chittorgarh, who refused to fall into the hands of the enemy and instead martyred herself and died a valiant death, just like the plight of Begum Jaan.

As the movie ends, Ilyas and Hari are seen to be remorseful of their actions; Ilyas shoots himself and we are shown the remains of the brothel and the end to the Begum Jaan legacy.

Cast 

Vidya Balan as Begum Jaan
Ila Arun as Amma
Gauahar Khan as Rubina
Pallavi Sharda as Gulabo
Priyanka Setia as Jameela
 Ridheema Tiwari as Amba
Flora Saini as Maina
Raviza Chauhan as Lata
Poonam Rajput as Rani
Mishti as Shabnam
Gracy Goswami as Laadli
Pitobash Tripathy as Surjeet
Sumit Nijhawan as Salim
Ashish Vidyarthi as Hari Prasad
Chunky Pandey as Kabir
Rajit Kapoor as Iliyas Khan
Vivek Mushran as Masterji
Rajesh Sharma as Shyam
Naseeruddin Shah as Raja Sahib
 Ashok Dhanuka as Sardar Vallabhbhai Patel
 Sanjay Gurbaxani as Jawaharlal Nehru
 Dicky Banerjee as Muhammad Ali Jinnah
 Patrick Eyre as Louis Mountbatten
 Steve Burroughs as Hastings Ismay
 Raja Biswas as Cyril Radcliffe
 Dilip Dave as an old customer of Gulabo

Characters

Production 
This film is the remake of a Bengali film, Rajkahini, which was released in 2015. Principal photography of the film began in June 2016 and was completed in August 2016 in Ranishwar block of Dumka district in Jharkhand.

Soundtrack 

The music for the film is composed by Anu Malik and Kausar Munir has written the lyrics for songs. The soundtrack was released by Times Music. Prem Mein Tohre, sung by Asha Bhosle, was launched on 14 February 2017 to high praise. For the second song, Aazaadiyan brought together Sonu Nigam and Rahat Fateh Ali Khan. The full music album was released on 6 April 2017. On 9 April 2017, the sixth song of this album, "Woh Subah" was released. This song is a recreated version of the song "Woh Subah Kabhi To Aayegi" from the 1958 Bollywood movie, Phir Subah Hogi, composed by Khayyam and written by Sahir Ludhiyanvi. The original song was voiced by Mukesh and Asha Bhosle, while the new version had the voices of Arijit Singh and Shreya Ghoshal. On 12 April 2017, the last song of this album, "Murshida", was released as a "bonus track". This song is penned by Rahat Indori and sung by Arijit Singh.

Marketing 
The first look of the movie introducing Vidya Balan as Begum Jaan was launched on 3 March 2017. The second poster of the movie was launched on 14 April 2017. The trailer of the movie was launched on 14 March 2017 to much critical and commercial acclaim. The trailer crossed 20 million views on Facebook and YouTube within a weeks time.

Reception 
, the film holds a 10% approval rating on review aggregator Rotten Tomatoes, based on ten reviews with an average rating of 3.86/10.

The film received mixed to negative reviews from critics. Meena Iyer of The Times of India gave the film a rating of 3.5 out of 5 and said that, "Vidya invests fully in Begum and her dialogue-baazi (a lot of which is raunchy) will get ceetis (whistles). However, the writer-director's interest level in everything else, falters." Rohit Vats of the Hindustan Times gave the film a rating of 2.5 out of 5 saying that, "The 134-minute long Begum Jaan has Vidya Balan in good form, but it lacks cohesiveness as a complete story. It shies away from delving deep into the theme, but you may appreciate its documentary-like feel." Raja Sen of NDTV gave the film a rating of 1 out of 5 and said that, "It is very difficult to take the highly cheesy Begum Jaan seriously, and the film squanders the talent of Vidya Balan". Namrata Joshi of The Hindu criticized the film saying that, "Each scene feels consciously staged than unprompted and the flow from one sequence to the next is perennially jerky leading to way too much chaos on- screen." Rajeev Masand of News18 gave the film a rating of 2 out of 5 saying that, "The film has an interesting premise and Vidya is commanding as the feared brothel owner who lords over her home. What lets it down is the shrill treatment." Rajyasree Sen of Live Mint criticized the film saying that, "Srijit Mukherji's magnum opus 'Begum Jaan' is an utter travesty to feminism, cinema and female actors in the Hindi film industry".

Shubhra Gupta of The Indian Express gave the film a rating of 1.5 out of 5 and said that, "Such a waste of a talented bunch of actors. And of Balan, who tries hard to invest some feeling into a role which turns into a cliché the moment the film opens." Saibal Chatterjee of NDTV praised the performance of Vidya Balan saying that, "Vidya Balan could count this performance as another feather in her already overflowing cap" but found the film to be "passable at best". The critic gave the film a rating of 2.5 out of 5 and said that, "A potentially explosive idea lost in banshee-like shrillness, rapid-fire storytelling and much volatility triggered by a collision of history and hysteria: that in a nutshell is Begum Jaan". Sukanya Verma of Rediff criticized the film saying that, "Full of histrionics and misandry, Begum Jaan shows little understanding of the trauma and impasse afflicting those in its grip." The critic gave the film a rating of 2 out of 5 and concluded her review by saying that, "In its preoccupation with drama, Begum Jaan neglects to reveal its soul. As a consequence, you feel nothing for the characters, their cause or fate." Suhani Singh of India Today criticized the film saying that, "Begum Jaan for all its good intent is a misfire of epic proportions."

References

External links 

2010s Hindi-language films
2017 films
Indian drama films
Hindi-language drama films
Films set in Mumbai
Hindi remakes of Bengali films
Films about prostitution in India
Films set in Punjab, India
Films set in the partition of India
Films directed by Srijit Mukherji
2017 drama films
Films about courtesans in India
Cultural depictions of Jawaharlal Nehru
Cultural depictions of Louis Mountbatten, 1st Earl Mountbatten of Burma
Cultural depictions of Vallabhbhai Patel
Cultural depictions of Muhammad Ali Jinnah